The Electrical Engineering School of Tuzla is a high school located in Tuzla, which was founded in 1970, with the goal to join all professions related to electrical engineering in one school, that were in two schools before 1970.

The Electrical Engineering School of Tuzla is dedicated to teaching their students the most  acts of Electrical sources and technology. The school also houses high-tech electrical equipment which provides more opportunities for students to do some practical work. Students may choose between many courses such as Computer Technician, Technician of Mechatronics, Technician of Electroenergetics, Technician of Electronics, Electrician of telecommunications, Car electrician and Electrician. The school plans to shift to solar panel energy by the summer of 2019, which will open up a new available course: technician of renewable energy sources.

Schools in Bosnia and Herzegovina
Educational institutions established in 1970

Education in Tuzla
Buildings and structures in Tuzla